Angerer is a surname. Notable people with the surname include:

Karl Angerer (born 1979), German bobsledder
Kathy Angerer (born 1957), American politician
Klara Angerer (born 1965), Italian skier at the 1984 Winter Olympics and the 1988 Winter Olympics
Nadine Angerer (born 1978), German footballer
Pat Angerer (born 1987), American football player
Paul Angerer (1927–2017), Austrian violist
Peter Angerer (born 1959), German biathlete
Tobias Angerer (born 1977), German cross-country skier

German toponymic surnames

de:Angerer